Colonia Nápoles is a colonia, is an officially recognized neighborhood in Benito Juárez borough, Mexico City, and one of the iconic Mid-Century neighborhoods of Mexico City along with Colonia Del Valle.

Location

It is bordered by:
 Viaducto Río Becerra and colonia San Pedro de los Pinos on the west
 Viaducto Río Becerra and Viaducto Miguel Alemán, and colonia Escandón on the north
 Avenida de los Insurgentes and Colonia del Valle on the east
 on the south, colonia Ampliación Nápoles stretches from Calle Georgia to Eje 5 Sur San Antonio; across San Antonio is colonia Ciudad de los Deportes.

Description

Landmarks include the World Trade Center complex with offices, restaurants, cinemas and shopping, and the Polyforum Cultural Siqueiros, a performing arts center designed and painted by  David Alfaro Siqueiros one of the most important muralists and painter in Mexico. 

One of the original developments here in the late 1930s was Parque de la Lama, designed by Raúl Basurto, one of the principal architects of many of the new residential areas like Polanco, a section of Roma or Del Valle, Hipódromo and others. The neighborhood was one of the most important spots for new modern architects as Vladimir Kaspé or young Pedro Ramírez Vázquez new buildings. Also in a section of the neighborhoods, in the 1940s, the covenant required buyers to build single-family houses in a historic style called "Colonial California", (a Mexican term for the California style of Spanish Colonial Revival architecture). Many houses of this style can still be seen in Nápoles. Sample of the architecture in Mid-century modern style, is the house designed in 1946 for the recognized architect Vladimir Kaspé in the corner of the streets of Dakota and Nueva Jersey. La Nápoles and La del Valle are the most iconic mid-century neighborhoods in the city.  More recently, contemporary apartment buildings have been built as infill, some by Javier Sánchez.

The neighborhood has the Parque Alameda Nápoles (Alfonso Esparza Oteo), a  park.

Transportation

Public transportation

The area is served by the Mexico City Metrobús and EcoBici bikeshare.

Metrobus stations
 Nápoles
 Poliforum
 La Piedad

Gallery

References 

Benito Juárez, Mexico City
Napoles